Pithampur is a town near Dhar city in the Dhar district of Madhya Pradesh, India. Pithampur is an industrial city, and is a part of Indore Metropolitan Region. Pithampur houses major industries and companies of Madhya Pradesh.

Demographics

As of the 2011 Census of India, Pithampur had a population of 1,26,099. Males constitute 58% of the population and females 42%. Pithampur has an average literacy rate of 62%, higher than the national average of 59.5%:- male literacy is 73%, and female literacy is 47%. In Pithampur, 18% of the population is under 6 years of age.

Pithampur Industrial Area
Pithampur has an Industrial area. Parts of Pithampur Industrial area hosts several Large Scale Industries like Torrent Pharmaceuticals.

Transport 
The nearest airport is Indore.

References

External links
 
 

Cities and towns in Dhar district
Economy of Indore
Cities in Madhya Pradesh